The partial list of political families of Uttar Pradesh state of India and their notable members:

The Ansari Family 
 Mukhtar Ahmed Ansari, former President of Indian National Congress (1927-1928) and former President of All India Muslim League (1920-1921).
 Subhanullah Ansari, Leader of Communist Party of India (CPI) (son of Mukhtar Ahmed Ansari)
 Afzal Ansari, Lok Sabha MP of Ghazipur (son of Subhanullah) 
 Sibgatullah Ansari,  MLA of Mohammadabad (2007-2017) (son of Subhanullah)
 Mannu Ansari, MLA of Mohammadabad (2022-Present) (son of Sibgatullah)
 Mukhtar Ansari, MLA of Mau (1996-2022) (son of Subhanullah)
 Abbas Ansari, MLA of Mau (2022-Present) (son of Mukhtar Ansari)
 Abdul Aziz Ansari (nephew of Mukhtar Ahmed Ansari)
 Hamid Ansari, former Vice President of India (2007-2017) (grand-nephew of Mukhtar Ahmed Ansari) and (2nd cousin of Afzal, Sibgatullah and Mukhtar Ansari)

The Bhadri Family 
 Raja Bajrang Bahadur Singh, former Lieutenant Governor of Himachal Pradesh (1955-1963); (He had no child)
 Uday Pratap Singh (adopted son of Bajrang Bahadur Singh)
 Raghuraj Pratap Singh (Raja Bhaiya), Founder of Jansatta Dal Loktantrik, former Cabinet Minister In Government of UP, MLA From Kunda (son of Uday Pratap Singh)

Note: The Bhadri Family belongs To Oudh Royal Family.

The Chaudhary Family
 Chaudhary Charan Singh, former Prime Minister of India (1979-1980) and former Chief Minister of UP (1967-1968 and Feb to Oct 1970)
 Chaudhary Ajit Singh, founder of Rashtriya Lok Dal (RLD), former Lok Sabha MP of Baghpat and former Union Minister of India for Agriculture and Civil Aviation (son of Charan Singh)
 Jayant Chaudhary, present Chairman of RLD and Rajya Sabha MP (2022-Present); Lok Sabha MP of Mathura (2009-2014) (grandson of Charan Singh)

The Chauhan (Narain) Family
 Chaudhary Narain Singh, 1st Deputy Chief Minister of Uttar Pradesh
 Sanjay Singh Chauhan, former MP of Bijnor. (son of Narain Singh)

The Gorakhnath Math Family
 Mahant Digvijay Nath, former state president of Hindu Mahasabha and former Lok Sabha MP of Gorakhpur (1967-1969)
 Mahant Avaidyanath, former Lok Sabha MP of Gorakhpur, Later joined Bhartiya Janta Party (BJP) (adopted son of Digvijay Nath)
 Mahant Yogi Adityanath, former Lok Sabha MP of Gorakhpur (1998-2018); Chief Minister of UP (2017-Present) (adopted son of Avaidyanath)

The Hasan Family
 Akhtar Hasan, former Lok Sabha MP of Kairana (1984-1989) (father of Munawwar)
 Chaudhary Munawwar Hasan, former Lok Sabha MP of Kairana and Muzaffarnagar; former Rajya Sabha MP (1998-2003).
 Begum Tabassum Hasan, former MP of Kairana (2009-2014), (wife of Munawwar)
 Nahid Hasan, MLA of Kairana (2014-Present) (son of Munawwar)
 Iqra Hasan (daughter of Munawwar)

Note: Hasan Family is a Muslim Gurjar family from Kairana, Uttar Pradesh in India.

The Khan family 
 Azam Khan, former Leader of the Opposition of UP Legislative Assembly; former Cabinet Minister in Government of UP; former Lok Sabha MP (2019-2022) and Rajya Sabha MP; 10 term MLA of Rampur
 Tazeen Fatma, former MP of Rajya Sabha (2014-2019); former MLA of Rampur (wife of Azam Khan)
 Abdullah Azam Khan, MLA of Suar (2017-Present) (son of Azam Khan)

The Khurshid Family 
 Khurshed Alam Khan, former External Affairs Minister of India and former Governor of Karnataka and Goa. (son-in-law of Dr. Zakir Hussain).
 Salman Khurshid, former External Affairs and Minority Affairs Minister of India and former MP from Farrukhabad (son of Khurshed Alam Khan).

The Singh (Kalyan) Family
 Kalyan Singh, former Chief Minister of UP and former Governor of Rajasthan
 Rajveer Singh, Lok Sabha MP of Etah since 2014. (son of Kalyan Singh)  
 Sandeep Singh, MLA of Atrauli (2017-Present) and Minister of Basic Education (2022-Present) in Government of UP. (grandson of Kalyan Singh)

The Singh (Rajnath) Family
 Rajnath Singh, Defence Minister of India (2019-Present) and former Chief Minister of Uttar Pradesh (2000 to 2002).
 Pankaj Singh, MLA of Noida (2017-Present) (son of Rajnath Singh).
 Sushma Singh, (wife of Pankaj)
 Neeraj Singh, (son of Rajnath Singh)

The Yadav Family
The Yadav family is extended family of Samajwadi party leader Mulayam Singh Yadav, family lines of his 4 real brothers and 1 cousin brother.

 Sughar Singh Yadav (father of Mulayam)
  Mulayam Singh Yadav, Founder of Samajwadi Party, former Chief Minister of UP (2003-2007) and former Defence Minister of India.
 Akhilesh Yadav, former Chief Minister of UP (2017-2022) (son of Mulayam)
 Dimple Yadav, former Lok Sabha MP of Kannauj (wife of Akhilesh)
 Prateek Yadav, businessman (step-son of Mulayam) and (step-brother of Akhilesh)
 Aparna Yadav (wife of Prateek)
 Abhay Ram Yadav (brother of Mulayam)
 Dharmendra Yadav, former Lok Sabha MP of Badaun (son of Abhay Ram) (nephew of Mulayam)
 Anurag Yadav (nephew of Mulayam)
 Sandhya Yadav, former Chairperson of Mainpuri Zila Panchayat, (daughter of Abhay Ram) and (niece of Mulayam)
 Sheela Yadav (niece of Mulayam), her son Rahul Yadav is married to Isha Yadav (daughter of Sadhu Yadav)
 Rajpal Singh Yadav, (brother of Mulayam)
 Premlata Yadav, former Chairperson of Etawah Zila Panchayat (2006-2016); (wife of Rajpal) and (sister-in-law of Mulayam)
 Abhishek Yadav (Anshul), present Chairman of Etawah Zila Panchayat (2016-Present) (son of Rajpal), (nephew of Mulayam) and (cousin of Akhilesh).
 Aryan Yadav (son of Rajpal) (nephew of Mulayam) and (cousin of Akhilesh)
 Shivpal Singh Yadav (youngest brother of Mulayam), MLA of Jaswantnagar; former PWD Minister in Government of UP
 Aditya Yadav, (son of Shivpal) and (nephew of Mulayam)
 Ratan Singh Yadav (brother of Mulayam)
 Ranvir Singh Yadav, former Block Pramukh of Saifai block (son of Ratan Singh) (nephew of Mulayam)
 Mridula Yadav, Block Pramukh of Saifai block (2016-Present) (wife of Ranvir) and (mother of Tej Pratap)
 Tej Pratap Singh Yadav,  former Lok Sabha MP of Mainpuri, (grand-nephew of Mulayam), (nephew of Akhilesh) and (son-in-law of Lalu)
 Raj Lakshmi Yadav, (wife of Tej Pratap Singh Yadav) and (daughter of Lalu Prasad Yadav)
 Bachchi Lal Yadav, (brother of Sughar Yadav) and (uncle of Mulayam)
 Ram Gopal Yadav, MP of Rajya Sabha (2008-Present) (cousin of Mulayam) and (son of Bachchi Lal)
 Akshay Yadav, former Lok Sabha MP of Firozabad (son of Ram Gopal)

See also
Political families of India

References

 
Uttar Pradesh
Uttar Pradesh politics-related lists
Lists of people from Uttar Pradesh